Sarah Adwoa Safo (born 28 December 1981) is a Ghanaian lawyer and politician. She is the New Patriotic Party Member of Parliament (2013–2020) for the Dome Kwabenya Constituency of the Greater Accra Region of Ghana. She was the Minister for Gender, Children and Social Protection until 28 July 2022 when she was dismissed by Nana Akuffo Addo Danquah.

Early life and education
Adwoa Safo was born to Ghanaian industrialist and pastor, Apostle Kwadwo Safo on 28 December 1981. She was home-tutored and wrote and passed her GCE A’ Level in 1998. At age 17, she entered the University of Ghana Faculty of Law where she obtained Bachelor of Law (L.L.B.) degree in 2002. Safo was the vice-president of the Law Students Union (LSU) in her final year. She then continued to the Ghana School of Law and was called to the Bar in October 2004 at the age of 22. She holds an LLM from George Washington University. In September 2022, she graduated from the University of Nottingham with a Postgraduate Diploma in Public Procurement law and Policy.

Career
She worked briefly with the Office of the Attorney General for the District of Columbia, Washington DC in the United States and thereafter returned to Ghana to serve her nation. On her return home in late 2005, she joined the law firm Kulendu @ law, then Zoe, Akyea & Co, as a private legal practitioner and concurrently served on the Mediation Committee of the Legal Aid Board of Ghana as a Mediator.

She worked as the first legal officer of the Public Procurement Authority (PPA) for two (2) years and was very instrumental in the formulation of the proposals that formed the basis for the creation of the Appeals and Complaint Panel of PPA and the change of the name Public Procurement Board to Public Procurement Authority. 
 
She was first elected as the member of parliament for Dome Kwabenya in 2012. And she has been re-elected in 2016 and 2020. She was deputy majority leader of the 7th Parliament of the Republic of Ghana and is the only female MP in Ghana to ascend to the number 2 position of the Majority front.

She was appointed Minister of State in charge of Government Procurement in 2017, serving till 2021; under Nana Addo Dankwa Akufo-Addo, 5th president of the 4th Republic of Ghana.

In the eighth parliament under the fourth Republic of Ghana, President Akufo-Addo appointed her as the Minister for Gender, Children and Social Protection sge served in this capacity until 28 July 2022 when she was relieved of her duties.

Personal life 
She got married on 17 August 2019.

Awards and recognition
Adwoa was a nominee for the Nobles Forum Award in 2012. She was honored by Glitz Africa as one of the Top 100 Women of the Year.

References

Living people
1981 births
New Patriotic Party politicians
Ghanaian women lawyers
Ghanaian MPs 2021–2025
21st-century Ghanaian lawyers